Swarnim Wagle is the Chief Economic Advisor at the UNDP Regional Bureau for Asia and the Pacific in New York. He is a former Vice-Chair and Member of the National Planning Commission of Nepal, headed by the Prime Minister. He served as Vice-Chair from August 2017 to February 2018, and as Member of the National Planning Commission of Nepal for two terms (September 2016 to August 2017 and May 2014 to November 2015).

Dr. Wagle currently chairs the Institute for Integrated Development Studies (IIDS), a South Asian policy think tank established in Kathmandu in 1979. He has also worked as a senior policy advisor and economist in international organizations like UNDP and the World Bank. He holds academic degrees from the London School of Economics, Harvard University and the Australian National University.

References

Nepalese economists
Living people
Harvard Kennedy School alumni
People from Gorkha District
Year of birth missing (living people)
Alumni of the London School of Economics
Australian National University alumni
Nepali Congress politicians from Gandaki Province